Bernd Brodar (born 21 July 1947) is an Austrian fencer. He competed in the individual and team sabre events at the 1972 Summer Olympics.

References 

1947 births
Living people
Austrian male fencers
Austrian sabre fencers
Olympic fencers of Austria
Fencers at the 1972 Summer Olympics